The Devil's Castle is a conspicuous mountain rising above the Kaiser Franz Josef Fjord at the SE end of Andrée Land in eastern Greenland. The feature is within the boundaries of Northeast Greenland National Park, currently the largest park on earth.

Geography
The Devil's Castle  is a prominent mountain of reddish rock with a lighter stripe extending diagonally across its face. It is located within the Kaiser Franz Joseph Fjord about 100 km from the mouth, close to the southern side of Cape Petersens, the NW extremity of Ymer Island. It rises steeply from the shore of the first bend of the fjord, south of Eleonore Bay. 

This striking and easily noticeable mountain was named Teufelschloss ("Devil's Castle" or "Devil's Palace") by the Second German North Polar Expedition led by Carl Koldewey that first surveyed and partially explored the Kaiser Franz Joseph Fjord in 1869–70.

See also
List of mountains of Greenland

References

External links

Weather forecast for Teufelsschloss (Greenland)
Devil's Castle